Alicia Esther Nash (née Lardé Lopez-Harrison; January 1, 1933 – May 23, 2015) was a Salvadoran-American physicist. The wife of mathematician John Forbes Nash Jr., she was a mental-health care advocate, who gave up her professional aspirations to support her husband and son, who were both diagnosed with schizophrenia.

Her life with Nash was chronicled in the 1998 book, A Beautiful Mind by Sylvia Nasar, as well as in the 2001 film of the same title directed by Ron Howard, in which she was portrayed by Jennifer Connelly.

Personal life 
Alicia Lardé Lopez-Harrison was born on January 1, 1933, in El Salvador, the daughter of Alicia (née Lopez-Harrison) and Carlos Lardé, a doctor. The Lardé family also included two boys, Carlos and Rolando Lardé. Both of her parents came from socially prominent, well-travelled families who spoke several languages. Her aunt was the poet Alice Lardé de Venturino; her paternal grandfather was Jorge Lardé, a chemical engineer.

When Lardé was a child, her father traveled to the United States a few times before deciding to move the family there permanently in 1944. After first settling in Biloxi, Mississippi, the family later moved to New York City. Lardé was accepted to the Marymount School with the help of a letter of recommendation from El Salvador's Ambassador to the United States. Following graduation from Marymount, Lardé was accepted into Massachusetts Institute of Technology, to study physics. She was one of very few women studying at MIT in the 1950s. There she met her future husband, John Forbes Nash, Jr.

Despite signs of Nash's mental illness which had emerged in the early 1950s, the couple married in 1957. She became pregnant with their son John Charles Martin Nash, who was to develop schizophrenia, in 1958; shortly before the birth in 1959, Nash was committed to McLean Hospital to receive psychiatric treatment for his illness. After spending 50 days in hospital, he was released, but was re-committed three times over the next few years against his will, by his sister. The couple divorced in 1963, but when John's mother died in 1968, he pressed Alicia to allow him to return to live with her. In 1970, he moved in, and she continued to help take care of her by then ex-husband; the couple remarried in 2001.

In 2002, the couple visited her native country, El Salvador, where she was honored by the president, Francisco Flores Pérez, with a tribute to her life.

Career 
After graduation from MIT, Nash went to work for the Brookhaven Nuclear Development Corporation as a lab physicist. In the early 1960s, she worked for RCA as an aerospace engineer, but was laid off. She then worked for years at Con Edison as a system programmer and later for the New Jersey Transit system as a computer programmer and data analyst. She was a member of numerous women's engineering societies. When the film A Beautiful Mind was released, Alicia Nash was serving as president of MIT's Alumni Association Board.

Mental health advocacy 
Nash became a spokesperson for schizophrenia and mental illness. In 2005 she was given the Luminary Award from the Brain & Behavior Research Foundation. She travelled around the country to discuss rights for those with mental illness, and in 2009 she met with New Jersey state lawmakers to discuss how to improve that state's mental health care system. In 2012, she was honored at the University of Texas at Austin's John and Alicia Nash Conference for her support of those with mental illness, where she delivered the keynote address.

Death 
Alicia and her husband were killed in a car crash on the New Jersey Turnpike on May 23, 2015, in Monroe Township, New Jersey. They were on their way home after a visit to Norway, where her husband had been awarded the Abel Prize. The driver of the taxicab they were riding in from Newark Airport lost control of the cab and struck a guardrail. Both passengers were ejected and killed.

Portrayal in media 
Nash was portrayed by Jennifer Connelly in the 2001 film A Beautiful Mind. For her performance, Connelly won the Academy Award for Best Supporting Actress, mentioning Nash during her acceptance speech. Writing in the Los Angeles Times, Lisa Navarrette criticized Connelly's casting as an example of whitewashing.

References

Further reading 
 A Beautiful Mind by Sylvia Nasar, 1998

External links 

1933 births
2015 deaths
American women physicists
American physicists
American computer programmers
American women engineers
MIT School of Engineering alumni
Mental health activists
People from San Salvador
People from West Windsor, New Jersey
Road incident deaths in New Jersey
Salvadoran emigrants to the United States
20th-century women engineers
Engineers from New Jersey
21st-century American women